The Varmint is a lost 1917 American comedy silent film directed by William Desmond Taylor, written by Gardner Hunting and Owen Johnson, and starring Jack Pickford, Louise Huff, Theodore Roberts, Henry Malvern, Ben Suslow and Milton Schumann. It was released on August 5, 1917, by Paramount Pictures.

Plot

Cast

References

External links 
 

1917 films
1910s English-language films
Silent American comedy films
1917 comedy films
Paramount Pictures films
Films directed by William Desmond Taylor
American black-and-white films
Lost American films
American silent feature films
1917 lost films
Lost comedy films
Films based on American novels
1910s American films